The Atlantic Coast Line P-5-A was a class of 70 4-6-2 USRA Light Pacific steam locomotives built by the American Locomotive Company's Richmond and Brooks Works between 1919 and 1920 for the Atlantic Coast Line Railroad (ACL) to haul their premier main line passenger trains. By the early 1950s, all of the P-5-As were retired and scrapped with exception of No. 1504, who survived into preservation and was currently undergoing restoration to operating condition.

Service history
The locomotives pulled passenger trains 10 to 12 cars long, including the Miamian, the Florida Special, Palmetto Limited, the Southland, the South Wind and the Dixie Flyer. By the late 1940s, the railroad had dieselised its passenger trains and they were assigned to fast freight service, of which they were successful in doing so. However, they cannot pull passenger trains exceeding 14 cars without double-heading, as such, they were replaced in heavier passenger service by the R-1 class of Northerns.

Preservation
Only one P-5-A has been preserved, No. 1504. It was chosen for preservation by ACL president Champion Davis and the Head of ACL's Mechanical Department, John W. Hawthornethe. In 1960, after some years in storage, the locomotive was given a thorough mechanical overhaul and then placed on display in front of the then new ACL General Office Building in Jacksonville. It was cosmetically restored and put on display at the Prime F. Osborn III Convention Center, where it fromerly resided until 2021. It is the only surviving original USRA Light Pacific steam locomotive and is in almost original condition.

The locomotive was designated as a National Historic Mechanical Engineering Landmark in 1990. It is also on the National Register of Historic Places.

In 2021, No. 1504 was purchased by the U.S. Sugar Corporation and moved to the FMW Solutions' Southeastern Office and Fabrication Shop in Chattanooga, Tennessee, where it is currently being restored to operating condition for the South Central Florida Express, Inc. in Clewiston, Florida.

References

Further reading

Atlantic Coast Line Railroad
Preserved steam locomotives of Tennessee
Preserved steam locomotives of Florida
4-6-2 locomotives
ALCO locomotives
Passenger locomotives
USRA locomotives
Railway locomotives introduced in 1919
Individual locomotives of the United States
Standard gauge locomotives of the United States